Stephen Walsh White (born 1951) is an author of psychological thriller fiction best known for his Dr. Alan Gregory series.

Bibliography

Novels

Alan Gregory Series

Privileged Information (1991), Book 1
Private Practices (1992), Book 2
Higher Authority (1994), Book 3
Harm's Way (1996), Book 4
Remote Control (1997), Book 5
Critical Conditions (1998),  Book 6
Manner Of Death (1999), Book 7
Cold Case (2000), Book 8
The Program (2001), Book 9
Warning Signs (2002), Book 10

The Best Revenge (2003), Book 11
Blinded (2004), Book 12
Missing Persons (2005), Book 13
Kill Me (2006), Book 14
Dry Ice (2007), Book 15
Dead Time (2008), Book 16
The Siege (2009), Book 17
The Last Lie (2010), Book 18
Line of Fire (2012), Book 19 - Part 1 of 2
Compound Fractures (2013), Book 20 - Part 2 of 2, and Alan Gregory series conclusion

References

External links
 Stephen White's official website

American horror writers
1951 births
Living people
Writers from Colorado